Naduvalur (West) is a village in the Udayarpalayam taluk of Ariyalur district, Tamil Nadu, India.

Demographics 

As per the 2001 census, Naduvalur (West) had a total population of 1633 with 823 males and 810 females.

References 

Villages in Ariyalur district